Merkaz Omen, also Omen, is a community settlement in northern Israel.

History
Mercaz Omen was founded in 1958 as a communal center for the nearby moshavim of Nir Yafeh, Meleah and Gadish. Located in the Ta'anakh region, it falls under the jurisdiction of Gilboa Regional Council.

References

Community settlements
Populated places in Northern District (Israel)
Populated places established in 1958
1958 establishments in Israel